Holston High School is a public secondary school located in Washington County, Virginia.

History
Holston was established in 1964, due to the consolidation of Liberty Hall High School and Damascus High School.

Athletics
The school mascot is the Cavalier and the school colors are red and black.

References

Public high schools in Virginia
Schools in Washington County, Virginia